Lantz is a surname of German and Swedish origin.

German origins  
The German surname Lantz is thought to have several origins. It is thought to possibly be a variant habitational surname adopted by people from settlements called "Lanz," a shortened habitational name derived from "Lanzo" or "Lando," which was originally a short form of various compound names using the element "land" or "territory", or possibly derived as a warrior's name from the weapon lance (modern German, "lanze"). Though found throughout Germany, today the surname is most heavily concentrated in the states of Hamburg and Schleswig-Holstein in the north, and Hesse, Rhineland-Palatinate, and Saarland in the southwest. Geographically, it may have originated in the region of Old Saxony.

Swedish origin 
The Swedish surname Lantz is thought to have originated as a military-related name derived from "lance," (modern Swedish, "lans") which is a pole weapon designed to be used by a mounted warrior or cavalry soldier called a Lancer. Military-related names became relatively common in the Swedish military in the 17th and 18th centuries as members were required to adopt unique surnames as a means to distinguish themselves from one another.

German Variants 
 Lanz
 Lanze
 Lantze
 Lanitz
 Land
 Lanzo
 Lando

Notable people with the surname
Adolf Lantz (1882–1949), Austrian screenwriter
Annika Lantz (born 1968), Swedish radio host, comedian and television presenter
Charles Lantz (1884–1962), American football coach
Francess Lantz (1952–2004), American fiction writer
Frank Lantz (born 1963), Director of the New York University Game Center
Gustaf Lantz (born 1981), Swedish politician
James A. Lantz (1921–2014), American lawyer and politician
Jeff Lantz, Canadian lawyer, judge and politician
Joachim Lantz (born 1977), Swedish football player
Jörgen Lantz (born 1943), Swedish actor
Kenneth Lantz (born 1949), Swedish politician
Lisa Lantz (born 1987), Swedish football player
Marcus Lantz (born 1975), Swedish football player
Maria Lantz, Swedish artist
Michael Lantz (1908–1988), American sculptor and medalist
Mose Lantz (1903–1969), American football player
Patricia Lantz, American politician
Rick Lantz, American football coach
Rob Lantz, Canadian politician
Simon E. Lantz (1872–1952), American farmer and politician
Stu Lantz (born 1946), American basketball player
Walter Lantz (1899–1994), American cartoonist and animator; creator of Woody Woodpecker

See also
Lanz (surname)

References

Surnames
German-language surnames
Swedish-language surnames
Germanic-language surnames
Occupational surnames